El Unico: Sus Más Grandes Exitos (English: The Only One: His more Greatest Hits) is a compilation album by Mexican singer Juan Gabriel release on July 20, 2004.

Track listing

References

External links 
official website
[] El Unico: Sus Más Grandes Exitos on allmusic.com
 El Unico: Sus Más Grandes Exitos on cduniverse.com

Juan Gabriel compilation albums
2004 compilation albums